

Current listings

|}

Former listings

|}

Notes

References

Southeast
Southeast Portland, Oregon